Santa Dreimane (born July 27, 1985 in Cēsis, Latvia) is a Latvian basketball player.

References

External links

1985 births
Living people
Latvian women's basketball players
People from Cēsis
21st-century Latvian women